World Wrestling Clubs Cup is an international wrestling clubs competition among teams representing member nations of the United World Wrestling (UWW) the sport's global governing body. The tournament was held on the proposal of the Islamic Republic of Iran Wrestling Federation in 2014 in Iran.

History

2014 Cup 
The inaugural cup was held in Juybar, Iran on November 26 to 28, 2014. The prize money for the top three teams was: $25,000 for first, $15,000 for second and $10,000 for third. A total of 15 teams competed. The Bangladesh team's participation was uncertain as the Bangladesh club Ansar did not release their wrestlers for the competition, who compromised 3 of the 8 wrestlers on the team, however the Bangladesh Amateur Wrestling Federation intervened to gain their release.

The cup was won by local Iranian club Bimeh-Razi who defeated Titan Mercury Wrestling Club (USA) in the final 6-2. Shoraye Shahr Karaj (Iran) finished third after defeating Wrestling Union (China) 7-1.

2015 Cup 
The second holding of the cup took part on November 26 and 27 2015 at the Azadi Sport Complex in Tehran, Iran. For the 2015 cup the organizers, Iran Wrestling Federation, were responsible for the provision of food, accommodation and local transport for each team, which could consist of 12 wrestlers, 2 coaches, 1 referee and 1 team leader.

The prize money on offer was increased from the previous year for the best three teams. $50,000 for first, $30,000 for second and $20,000 for third. A total of 15 teams competed in the two-day tournament.

The defending champions, Iran's Bimeh-Razi, were triumphant in the 2015 Cup for the second successive year after defeating Titan Mercury Wrestling Club (USA) in the final 7-1 that was hosted in front of a crowd of 5,000. Bimeh-Razi included the 57 kg world champion Vladimer Khinchegashvili, the 61 kg junior world champion Behnam Ehsanpour, the 65 kg world championship silver medalist Masoud Esmailpour, and the 70 kg world champion Magomedrasul Gazimagomedov. Titan Mercury Wrestling Club included the 86 kg junior world champion Mojtaba Goleij and the 96 kg 2012 Olympic Gold Medalist Jake Varner.

Format 
The cup involves team based dual style matches. This involves two clubs competing against each other with a single wrestler representative for each of the 8 weight divisions, Each dual is first decided by the match score, that is the club that wins the most out of the eight matches. If they are tied 4-4 then a tiebreaker is applied. The first tiebreaker is based on classification points, which are awarded for the method of victory, and the second tiebreaker, if needed, is the technical points scored during each match.

Results

Men's freestyle

Men's Greco-Roman

See also

 World Wrestling Championships
 Wrestling World Cup

References

External links
 Result of World Wrestling Clubs Cup
 UWW Website
  Results

Clubs
Wrestling competitions